The Wilson River, about  long, flows from the Northern Oregon Coast Range to Tillamook Bay in the U.S. state of Oregon. Formed by the confluence of its Devil's Lake Fork and its South Fork, it runs generally west through the Tillamook State Forest to its mouth near the city of Tillamook. It is one of five rivers—the Tillamook, the Trask, the Wilson, the Kilchis, and the Miami—that flow into the bay.

Course 
The river rises in the Tillamook State Forest in the mountains of northeastern Tillamook County. The river's North Fork rises in northern Tillamook County and flows south. Its South Fork rises in eastern Tillamook County and western Washington County and flows west to merge with Devils Lake Fork. Further downstream, the Wilson River receives the North Fork near Lees Camp. Oregon Route 6, also known as the Wilson River Highway, runs parallel to the river and links the Tualatin Valley and the Portland metropolitan area with the Oregon Coast.

Discharge
The United States Geological Survey (USGS) monitors the flow of the Wilson River at a stream gauge  from the mouth of the river.

Floods
The Wilson River was part of the Willamette Valley flood of 1996 when it rose to 19.51 inches on February 8, damaging roads and farms and houses in Tillamook. Since then it has risen to its highest recorded reading of 22.84 inches on November 7, 2006.

Fishing 

According to Fishing Oregon: An Angler's Guide to Oregon, the Wilson River is "one of the state's best steelhead and Chinook salmon fisheries". County-owned boat launches on the lower reaches and public access via Route 6 through the Tillamook State Forest make the river easily accessible to anglers. State regulations govern the seasons and methods of fishing.

See also
List of rivers of Oregon

References

External links
Tillamook Estuaries Partnership
Flyfishing on the Wilson

Rivers of Oregon
Tillamook, Oregon
Rivers of Tillamook County, Oregon
Rivers of Washington County, Oregon